Hõbesalu is a village in Lääneranna Parish, Pärnu County, in southwestern Estonia, on the coast of the Gulf of Riga. It has a population of 15 (as of 1 January 2011).

Half of the village is covered by Nehatu Nature Reserve.

References

Villages in Pärnu County